Bryce Gheisar (born December 22, 2004) is an American actor, best known for his leading roles as young Ethan in A Dog's Purpose and Julian in Wonder.

Early life 
Bryce Gheisar was born on December 22, 2004, in Plano, Texas, into a family of three, made up of his parents, Todd and Nicole Gheisar, and his older brother, Blake Gheisar. Bryce was a rising star in competitive gymnastics before he first discovered his love for acting. He currently resides in Plano, Texas, but has filmed all around North America.

Career 
Gheisar started his acting career aged eight. He landed his first role in 2015 as Elijah Gutnick in the short film The Bus Stop. After he was enrolled in Cathryn Sullivan's school for Acting, he made his first theatrical appearance playing the leading role of young Ethan, in the acclaimed 2017 film, A Dog's Purpose. That same year, he gained that much more widespread recognition when portraying one of the lead roles, Julian, in the Oscar-nominated film, Wonder, working alongside Jacob Tremblay, Millie Davis and Julia Roberts. From 2020 to 2021, Bryce portrayed Elliot Combes in the Nickelodeon TV series, The Astronauts.

Filmography

Film

Television

References

External links 
 
 Bryce Gheisar on Instagram

2004 births
Living people
Male actors from Texas
American male child actors
American male film actors
American male television actors